The 2023–24 season of the Frauen-Bundesliga will be the 34th season of Germany's premier women's football league. It will run from 15 September 2023 to 20 May 2024.

Teams

Stadiums

League table

References

External links
DFB.de

2023-24

Frauen-Bundesliga